Statue of Caesar Rodney can refer to:
 Statue of Caesar Rodney (U.S. Capitol)
 Equestrian statue of Caesar Rodney, Wilmington, Delaware